The 2014 Tri-Cities Fever season was the team's tenth season as a professional indoor football franchise and fifth in the Indoor Football League (IFL). One of nine teams competing in the IFL for the 2014 season, the Kennewick, Washington-based Tri-Cities Fever were members of the Intense Conference. Founded in 2005 as part of National Indoor Football League, the Tri-Cities Fever moved to the af2 in 2007 then jumped to the IFL before the 2010 season.

Under the leadership of owner/general manager Teri Carr and head coach Adam Shackleford, the team played their home games at the Toyota Center in Kennewick, Washington. Shackleford's staff includes assistant coach Cleveland Pratt and defensive line coach Kimo von Oelhoffen. The Fever Girls are the official dance team.

Off-field moves
Fever players participate in community programs, including the "After School Matters" after-school program and "Backpack Program" food assistance program at Eastgate Elementary in the Kennewick School District.

Awards and honors
On March 5, 2014, the IFL announced its Week 2 Players of the Week. Tri-Cities Fever linebacker Boris Lee was named Special Teams Player of the Week. Wide receiver Jackie Chambers received an Honorable Mention for offense. Defensive back Lionell Singleton received an Honorable Mention for defense. Kicker Brady Beeson received an Honorable Mention for special teams play. On March 12, 2014, the IFL announced its Week 3 Players of the Week. Tri-Cities Fever defensive back Lionell Singleton received a second Honorable Mention for defense.

On March 19, 2014, the IFL announced its Week 4 Players of the Week. Tri-Cities Fever defensive back Donyae Coleman received an Honorable Mention for defense and kick returner Lionell Singleton received a third Honorable Mention for special teams play. On March 26, 2014, the IFL announced its Week 5 Players of the Week. Tri-Cities Fever kicker Brady Beeson and kick returner Dennis Rogan each received an Honorable Mention for special teams play. This is Beeson's second of the season.

On April 9, 2014, the IFL announced its Week 7 Players of the Week. Tri-Cities Fever running back Keithon Flemming and wide receiver Harry Peoples received an Honorable Mention for offense. Defensive back Lionell Singleton received an Honorable Mention for defense. On April 23, 2014, the IFL announced its Week 9 Players of the Week. Tri-Cities Fever quarterback Houston Lillard was named as the Offensive Player of the Week. Defensive back Donyaé Coleman received an Honorable Mention for defense. Kicker Brady Beeson and kick returner Harry Peoples each received an Honorable Mention for special teams play.

Schedule
Key:

Regular season
All start times are local time

Roster

Standings

References

External links
 Tri-Cities Fever official website
 Tri-Cities Fever official statistics
 Tri-Cities Fever at Tri-City Herald

Tri-Cities Fever
Tri-Cities Fever seasons
Tri-Cities Fever